The Springthorpe Memorial is an elaborate Victorian era memorial located within Boroondara General Cemetery in Kew, Victoria, a suburb of Melbourne, Australia.
The memorial was built by Melbourne doctor John Springthorpe,
in honour of his wife, Annie Springthorpe (née Inglis), who died in 1897 at the age of 30 while giving birth to their fourth child. Construction began in 1897, and the memorial was unveiled in 1901. The Springthorpe Memorial is listed on the Victorian Heritage Register.

The centrepiece of the memorial, commissioned by the grieving Dr Springthorpe, is a marble sculpture by Bertram Mackennal. A figure of the deceased lies on a sarcophagus while an angel, standing beside her, places a wreath (now missing) by her head. A sorrowful, draped female figure sits beside the sarcophagus, clutching a lyre.

The sculpted figures are housed in a structure derivative of a Greek temple, designed by Melbourne architect Harold Desbrowe-Annear. It has dark marble columns, granite pediments and entablatures adorned with serpent-head gargoyles at each corner, and a stained glass domed roof. The latter is made up of hundreds of ruby-coloured glass pieces supported by radiating ironwork. On a fine day sunlight, streaming through the roof, imparts a reddish glow on the sculpture below.

The memorial is located in a garden setting which the curator of Melbourne's Royal Botanic Gardens, William Guilfoyle, was commissioned to design. However, the layout seen today probably has little in common with his original design.

The base of the memorial, surrounded by an iron picket balustrade, is paved with red tiles which have various verses inscribed on them in gold lettering. There are also inscriptions on each pediment and entablature of the temple structure, in both English and Greek.

Nowhere on the memorial is there any mention of the deceased's name, the most specific reference being the following inscription:

My own true love
Pattern daughter perfect mother and ideal wife
Born on the 26th day of January 1867
Married on the 26th day of January 1887
Buried on the 26th day of January 1897

Architectural features and influences

The Springthorpe Memorial is a classical style Greek revival temple that also incorporates some key Gothic features. Additionally, it employs an Ionian order, with a distinct emphasis on symmetry and proportion. Such classical attributes are juxtaposed with the more Gothic derived elements of the stained glass dome and the square plan. Inspired by John Ruskin, Springthorpe strove to create a structure that was authentic and permanent. This is reflected in the choice of materials including, marble from Carrara, green granite from Labrador, Bronze, cast iron cased in copper, mosaic tiles and glass. All aspects of the memorial, including the sculpture, structure and ornament are imbued with meaning which combined with the large range of materials gives it a broad level of engagement.

The memorial is conceptualised around a strong belief in Christianity in combination with a dramatisation and idealisation of love. Motivated by the desire to be reunited with his wife, Annie, Dr Springthorpe found comfort in a dual commitment to the Protestant church and to building a structure that would capture the complexity of his intense grief. Such devotion created a need to manifest something more solid and more sustaining than traditional forms of memorialising; of conceiving a '`whole [that] is more than a Tomb [but]…is the Real made Ideal – an apotheosis of love for all true lovers to the end of Time with its tale of loss, memory, separation and Reunion. To this end he wanted a representation that was creative, energetic, elaborate and universal. Such energy is captured in his enthusiastic use of text. The memorial is laden with inscriptions of chosen poets such as Whitman, Dante, Rossetti and Browning, as well as Springthorpe's personal thoughts. Fascinated by concepts of the ideal woman, Springthorpe had delivered a paper, several years earlier, entitled 'The Perfect Woman' in which he concluded that Shakespeare's Rosalind was the ideal. Annie seems to be likened to this ideal in the inscription "Pattern Daughter, Perfect Mother, and Ideal Wife".

Symbolic References of the Memorial

The Springthorpe memorial is laden with wide range of sculptural and textual symbolism and includes adaptations of the Bible, the Greek classics, Walt Whitman, Wordsworth, Dante, Browning, Riley, and Dante Gabriel Rossetti. Springthorpe wanted the structure to stand not just as a memorial for his wife, but also as an expression of the hope in loss for all mankind, and thus Annie's name was not inscribed anywhere on the memorial.
Circling the memorial from the eastern side, looking up at the four gables one reads the words, "Peace Evermore", "Life Evermore", "Light Evermore" and "Love Evermore", which were borrowed from a hymn in Dr. Charles Strong's collection for the Australian Church.
In the original sketches by Desbrowe-Annear, one metope at the end of the memorials frieze was to be filled with a classically inspired laurel wreath, but the completed scheme instead used sculptural bronze snake heads, designed by prominent Melbourne artist and close friend to Springthorpe, Sir John Longstaff. Snake heads were included for their strong association with death, the underworld and also with resurrection. Springthorpe, a devout Protestant doctor also saw the snake as a symbol of his profession and also, as a symbol of Woman.
Springthorpe, an avid follower of the English painter and poet Dante Rossetti, refers several times throughout his diary to Rossetti's Blessed Damozel. Two stanzas from this poem are inscribed in north elevation of the memorial:

The blessed damozel leaned out From the gold bar of Heaven; Her eyes were deeper than the depth Of waters stilled at even; She had three lilies in her hand, And the stars in her hair were seven.” 

It is worth noting too, that Annie is depicted in sculpture holding a bouquet of three lilies with a crown of seven stars ( the wreath has since been removed).  Included in the sculptural group sits a weeping woman at Annie's feet, eternalising human grief and sorrow, and on her other side stands the figure of an angel, a representation of god, death and immortality, who places the wreath on Annie's head.

References

External links
Boroondara General Cemetery
 Guide to the papers of Dr John William Springthorpe
The Springthorpe Memorial: Melbourne, Victorian, & Australian Architecture Topics

Monuments and memorials in Victoria (Australia)
Buildings and structures in the City of Boroondara
Greek Revival buildings
Heritage sites in Melbourne
Neoclassical architecture in Australia
1901 sculptures
1901 establishments in Australia